Santiago Cordero (born 6 December 1993) is an Argentine rugby union player currently playing for the Bordeaux team. He plays as wing or fullback.

Cordero played for Regatas from 2012 to 2015. In 2016 and 2017 he played for Jaguares, the Argentinian team in Super Rugby. He joined Exeter Chiefs in the Premiership Rugby in early 2018 as a medical joker, and became a full-time player for the 2018–19 season.

Cordero has 18 caps for Argentina, since his first test match at the 31–12 loss to England, at 9 November 2013, in Twickenham Stadium, aged 19 years old.

Cordero played one match in the 2013 End-of-year rugby union test for the Barbarians against Fiji, at the Centenary Match to mark 100 years of rugby in Fiji.

Cordero caught the attention of a wider rugby audience during the 2015 World Cup with his pace and stepping skills, having scored memorable tries, two against Georgia (in which he was named "Man of the Match") and one against Tonga. His clean breaks and distance covered were also noteworthy, thus making significant contributions to Argentina's fourth place in the tournament.

Cordero scored one try for the Argentinian side that beat the Barbarians 49–31 in the 2015 Killik Cup match, held at Twickenham on 21 November 2015.

Cordero signed for Exeter Chiefs in 2018 and has since played 33 games scoring 10 tries.  In March 2019 he was awarded the Gallagher Premiership Rugby Player of the Month, and in May 2019 was announced as one of the five nominees for the prestigious Rugby Players Association Player of the Year award.

Cordero is part of the Argentina squad that competes in the Rugby Championship.

On 6 January 2019, Cordero left Exeter to join French side Bordeaux in the Top 14 competition ahead of the 2019-20 season.

References

External links

 

1993 births
Living people
Argentine rugby union players
Argentine people of Spanish descent
Rugby union players from Buenos Aires
Rugby union fullbacks
Rugby union wings
Club de Regatas Bella Vista players
Pampas XV players
Jaguares (Super Rugby) players
Exeter Chiefs players
Union Bordeaux Bègles players
Argentina international rugby union players